The Greek Basket League MVP is the yearly MVP award that is awarded by the 1st-tier professional basketball league in Greece, the Greek Basket League.

Since the 2014–15 season, the Greek Basket League MVP award is voted on by the fans online, whereas previously it was not. The voting is currently decided by a ratio of 40% by the fans and the media, and 60% by the head coaches and the captains of each of the 14 teams of the Greek Basket League.

Since the 2010–11 season, the Greek Basket League's PIR leader is considered to be an unofficial statistical MVP award, that is based solely on the Performance Index Rating (PIR) statistic. This is not to be confused with the official Greek Basket League MVP award, which is an award that is based on a voting process, and that is awarded at the end of each season's playoffs.

Greek Basket League MVP award winners

Notes:
 There was no awarding in the 2019–20, due to the coronavirus pandemic in Europe.

Multiple Greek Basket League MVP award winners

See also
Greek Basket League awards
Greek Basket League Finals MVP

References

External links
 Official Greek Basket League Site 
 Official Greek Basket League YouTube Channel 
 Official Hellenic Basketball Federation Site 
 Basketblog.gr 
 GreekBasketball.gr 

European basketball awards
Greek Basket League
MVP
Basketball most valuable player awards

es:MVP de la A1 Ethniki
it:A1 Ethniki MVP